The Earth System Governance Project is a long-term, interdisciplinary social science research programme originally developed under the auspices of the International Human Dimensions Programme on Global Environmental Change. It started in January 2009.

The Earth System Governance Project currently consists of a network of ca. 300 active and about 2,301 indirectly involved scholars from all continents. The global research alliance has evolved into the largest social science research network in the area of governance and global environmental change. Since 2015 it is part of the overarching international research platform Future Earth. The International Project Office is hosted at Utrecht University, The Netherlands.

Aims 
The Earth System Governance Project aims to contribute to science on the large, complex challenges of governance in an era of rapid and large-scale environmental change. The project seeks to create a better understanding of the role of institutions, organizations and governance mechanisms by which humans regulate their relationship with the natural environment. The Earth System Governance Project aims to integrate governance research at all levels. The project aims to examine problems of the "global commons", but also local problems from air pollution to the preservation of waters, waste treatment or desertification and soil degradation. However, due to natural interdependencies local environmental pollution can be transformed into changes of the global system that affect other localities. Therefore, the Earth System Governance Project looks at institutions and governance processes both local and globally.

The Earth System Governance Project is a scientific effort, but also aims to assist policy responses to the pressing problems of earth system transformation.

Conceptual framework 

The concept of Earth System Governance is defined as: 
 ... the interrelated and increasingly integrated system of formal and informal rules, rule-making systems, and actor-networks at all levels of human society (from local to global) that are set up to steer societies towards preventing, mitigating, and adapting to global and local environmental change and, in particular, earth system transformation, within the normative context of sustainable development.

The Earth System Governance Project organizes its research according to a conceptual framework guided by five sets of research lenses according to their 2018 Science and Implementation Plan:
Architecture and agency
Democracy and power
Justice and allocation
Anticipation and imagination
Adaptiveness and reflexivity

These centre around four contextual conditions:
Transformations
Inequality
Anthropocene
Diversity

Origin and history 
In 2001, the four then active global change research programmes (DIVERSITAS, International Geosphere-Biosphere Programme, World Climate Research Programme, and International Human Dimensions Programme on Global Environmental Change) agreed to intensify co-operation through setting up an overarching Earth System Science Partnership. The research communities represented in this Partnership contend in the 2001 Amsterdam Declaration on Global Change that the earth system now operates "well outside the normal state exhibited over the past 500,000 years" and that "human activity is generating change that extends well beyond natural variability—in some cases, alarmingly so—and at rates that continue to accelerate." To cope with this challenge, the four global change research programmes have called "urgently" for strategies for Earth System management.

In March 2007, in response to the 2001 Amsterdam Declaration, the Scientific Committee of the International Human Dimensions Programme on Global Environmental Change (IHDP), the overarching social science programme in the field, mandated the drafting of the Science Plan of the Earth System Governance Project by a newly appointed Scientific Planning Committee. The Earth System Governance Project builds on the results of an earlier long-term research programme, the IHDP core project Institutional Dimensions of Global Environmental Change (IDGEC). In 2008, the Earth System Governance Project was officially launched.

In 2009, the Science and Implementation Plan of the Earth System Governance Project was published. In the science and implementation plan, the conceptual problems, cross-cutting themes, flagship projects, and its policy relevance are outlined in detail. The Science Plan was written by an international, interdisciplinary Scientific Planning Committee chaired by Prof. Frank Biermann, which drew on a consultative process that started in 2004. Several working drafts of this Science Plan have been presented and discussed at a series of international events and conferences, and numerous scholars in the field, as well as practitioners, have offered suggestions, advice, and critique.

Since then, the project has evolved into a broader research alliance that builds on an international network of research centers, lead faculty and research fellows. After the termination of the IHDP in 2014, the activities of the Earth System Governance research alliance are supported by an international steering group of representatives of the main Earth System Governance Research Centres and the global group of lead faculty and research fellows.

Since 2014 first discussions were held at the Conferences around new directions and a new Science and Implementation Plan. In 2016 lead authors were selected and invited. After reviewing by the Earth System Governance community, the final plan was launched at the 2018 Utrecht Conference.

In 2015 the Earth system governance Project is part of the overarching international research platform Future Earth.

Global research network 
For its activities and implementation, the Earth System Governance Project relies on a global network of experts from different academic and cultural backgrounds. The research network consists of different groups of scientific experts. The Earth System Governance Project operates under the direction of a Scientific Steering Committee. The role of the Scientific Steering Committee is to guide the implementation of the Earth System Governance Science Plan. 

An important element in the project organisation is the global alliance of research centres that brings together the University of Ghana; the University of Brasília; Utrecht University; the German Development Institute; the CETIP Network; VU University Amsterdam; the University of Amsterdam; the Australian National University; Chiang Mai University; Colorado State University; Lund University; the University of East Anglia; the University of Oldenburg; the Stockholm Resilience Centre; the University of Toronto; the Tokyo Institute of Technology and Yale University. In addition, strong networks on earth system governance research exist in China, Latin America, Central and Eastern Europe, and Russia.

Conferences 
Since 2007, the Project has organized major scientific conferences addressing the topics of governance and global environmental change, including:

 2007 Amsterdam Conference on the Human Dimensions of Global Environmental Change. 'Earth System Governance: Theories and Strategies for Sustainability'
 2008 Berlin Conference on the Human Dimension of Global Environmental Change. 'Long-Term Policies: Governing Social-Ecological Change'
 2009 Amsterdam Conference on the Human Dimensions of Global Environmental Change. 'Earth System Governance: People, Places, and the Planet'
 2010 Berlin Conference on the Human Dimensions of Global Environmental Change. 'Social dimensions of environmental change and governance'
 2011 Colorado Conference on Earth System Governance. 'Crossing Boundaries and Building Bridges'
 2012 Lund Conference on Earth System Governance. 'Towards Just and Legitimate Earth System Governance'
 2013 Tokyo Conference on Earth System Governance. 'Complex Architectures, Multiple Agents'
 2014 Norwich Conference on Earth System Governance. 'Allocation and Access in the Anthropocene'
 2015 Canberra Conference on Earth System Governance. 'Democracy and Resilience in the Anthropocene'
 2016 Nairobi Conference on Earth System Governance. 'Confronting Complexity and Inequality'
 2017 Lund Conference on Earth System Governance. 'Allocation & Access in a Warming and Increasingly Unequal World'
 2018 Utrecht Conference on Earth System Governance. 'Governing Global Sustainability in a Complex World'
 2019 Mexico Conference on Earth System Governance. 'Urgent Transformations and Earth System Governance: Towards Sustainability and Justice'
 The 2020 Conference on Earth System Governance will take place in Bratislava, the Slovak Republic. 'Earth System Governance in turbulent times: prospects for political and behavioral responses'

Publications 
There are four major publication series of the Earth System Governance Project.

The Journal Earth System Governance was launched in 2019.
Volume 1 (January 2019)
Volume 2 (April 2019)

The book series on earth system governance by the MIT Press is about the research objections of earth system governance. Interdisciplinary in scope, broad in governance levels and the use of methods, the books are aimed at investigating earth governance systems and finding conceivable amendments. They are hence addressing the scientific community and professionals in politics.
Global Environmental Governance and the Accountability Trap (February 2019)
Governing through Goals - Sustainable Development Goals as Governance Innovation (May 2017)
Governing Complex Systems - Social Capital for the Anthropocene (March 2017)
Dirty Gold - How Activism Transformed the Jewelry Industry (February 2017)
New Earth Politics - Essays from the Anthropocene (March 2016)
Power in a Warming World - The New Global Politics of Climate Change and the Remaking of Environmental Inequality (September 2015)
European Climate Leadership in Question - Policies toward China and India (July 2015)
Consensus and Global Environmental Governance - Deliberative Democracy in Nature's Regime (February 2015)
Earth System Governance - World Politics in the Anthropocene (November 2014)
Post-Treaty Politics - Secretariat Influence in Global Environmental Governance (October 2014)
Transparency in Global Environmental Governance - Critical Perspectives (July 2014)
Disaggregating International Regimes - A New Approach to Evaluation and Comparison (September 2012)
Global Environmental Governance Reconsidered (July 2012)
Institutional Dynamics - Emergent Patterns in International Environmental Governance (July 2010)

The Earth System Governance Project is also collaborating with Cambridge University Press to summarize the research conclusions of 10 years Earth System Governance Project.
Architectures of Earth System Governance - Institutional Complexity and Structural Transformation (April 2020)
Agency in Earth System Governance (January 2020)
Sustainability Transformations - Agents and Drivers across Societies (September 2019)
Urban Climate Politics - Agency and Empowerment (April 2019)
Anthropocene Encounters: New Directions in Green Political Thinking (January 2019)

The Cambridge Elements series on Earth System Governance focuses on current governance research relevant for practitioners and scientists. The series is aimed at providing ideas for policy improvements and analyses of socio-ecological systems by interdisciplinary and influential scholars.
Deliberative Global Governance (July 2019)
Environmental Human Rights in Earth System Governance. Democracy Beyond Democracy (2020)
The Making of Responsible Innovation (2020)

Research 
The Earth System Governance Project organizes Task Forces, international networks of senior and early career scholars with a series of working groups focused on particular ideas or idea clusters. There are currently seven Task Forces:
 Taskforce on Planetary Justice Research of Earth System Governance.
 Taskforce on New Technologies of Earth System Governance. 
 Task Force on Ocean Governance of Earth System Governance. 
 Task Force on Conceptual Foundations of Earth System Governance.
 Task Force on Earth System Law of Earth System Governance. 
 Task Force on Methodology for Earth System Governance Research.
 Task Force on Accountability in Global Environmental Governance.

Affiliated projects are the Norms of Global Governance Initiative (NGGI), Innovations in Climate Governance (INOGOV), Improving Earth Systems Governance through 'Purpose Ecosystems', Governing the EU's Climate and Energy Transition in Turbulent Times (GOVTRAN), Global Goals, Environmental Governance in the Intermountain West: A study group of the Environmental Governance Working Group, CROWD_USG: Crowdsourcing Urban Sustainability Governance, and Behind the Scenes: Mapping the Role of Treaty Secretariats in International Environmental Policy-Making. 

Projects are the ReSET Programme 'Governance of Global Environmental Change',  Governance 'of' and 'for' the Sustainable Development Goals (SDG), Future Earth FTI 'Bright Spots: Seeds of a Good Anthropocene', Future Earth Cluster 'Extreme Events and Environments from Climate to Society' (E3S), Europe's approach to implementing the Sustainable Development Goals: good practices and the way forward, Climate-Smart Agriculture in Sub-Saharan Africa, and the BBNJ Initiative.

Policy influence 
In 2011, the Earth System Governance Project launched an initiative on International Environmental Governance. This initiative aims to provide a forum for discussion of current and ongoing research on international environmental governance and the institutional framework for sustainable development, in the period leading up to the 2012 United Nations Conference on Sustainable Development in Rio de Janeiro, also known as Rio + 20. In addition, the initiative aims to target decision-makers and to contribute not just to a better understanding but also to actual improvements in international environmental governance towards an institutional framework that enables sustainable development.

In 2012, 33 leading scholars from the Project wrote a blueprint for reform of strengthening earth system governance, which was published in Science. 

In 2014, the Project's chair Frank Biermann was invited to speak in the United Nations General Assembly.

Context 
There is widespread support for the Earth System Governance Project in the scientific community, which is reflected in the size of the research network and in various publications by experts. However, criticisms of the Earth System Governance Project have also been made. 

In an internal report of the International Human Dimensions Programme it is stated that the steering group of the Earth System Governance Project is too much dominated by experts from OECD countries. Since then, the Earth System Governance Project has actively sought ways to involve experts from different regions of the world. 

The idea of earth system governance has also been criticized for being too top-down, for placing too much emphasis on global governance structures. According to Mike Hulme, earth system governance represents an attempt to "geopolitically engineer" our way out of the climate crisis. He questions whether the climate is governable and argues that it is way too optimistic and even hubristic to attempt to control the global climate by universal governance regimes. This interpretation of the novel concept, however, has been rejected by other scholars as being too narrow and misleading.

Related projects 
 Earth System Science Partnership
 International Geosphere-Biosphere Programme
 International Human Dimensions Programme
 World Climate Research Programme
 DIVERSITAS, an international programme for biodiversity research
 Global Carbon Project
 Land-Ocean Interactions in the Coastal Zone
 Global Land Project
 Urbanization and Global Environmental Change Project
 Global Water System Project

See also
 Climate governance
 Earth system governance
 Ecological economics
 Ecological modernization
 Environmental policy
 Global environmental governance
 Sustainable development
 Sustainability governance
 Transition management

References

External links
 Earth System Governance Project

Climate change policy
International sustainability organizations
Social sciences organizations
Earth system sciences
International scientific organizations
Environmental policies organizations